Rachel Hope Cleves (born 1975) is an American-Canadian historian, best known for her 2014 book Charity and Sylvia: A Same-Sex Marriage in Early America. The book, a study of historical documents concerning the same-sex relationship of Charity Bryant and Sylvia Drake in the 19th century, was a shortlisted Lambda Literary Award nominee for LGBT Studies at the 27th Lambda Literary Awards.

Born in New York City in 1975, Cleves studied at Columbia University and the University of California, Berkeley, and has been a professor at the University of Victoria in Victoria, British Columbia since 2009. She is a specialist in early American history, with research areas including gender and sexuality, the American relationship with the French Revolution, and the War of 1812.

She has also published the book The Reign of Terror in America: Visions of Violence from Anti-Jacobinism to Antislavery (2009), as well as articles in journals such as Early American Studies, Reviews in American History and the Journal of American History.

In 2019, she was elected a Fellow of the Royal Society of Canada.

References

External links
Rachel Hope Cleves

21st-century American historians
Writers from New York City
Writers from Victoria, British Columbia
Academic staff of the University of Victoria
21st-century American non-fiction writers
21st-century Canadian historians
Living people
American women historians
Columbia University alumni
University of California, Berkeley alumni
1975 births
21st-century Canadian women writers
Canadian women historians
Historians from New York (state)
Fellows of the Royal Society of Canada
21st-century American women writers